St Edward's College is an independent Catholic secondary day school for boys, located in , in the Central Coast region of New South Wales, Australia. The school was founded by the Congregation of Christian Brothers in 1953, who continue to run the school. Colloquially referred to as Eddies, the College caters for boys from Year 7 to Year 12. St Edward's is the only Catholic independent all-boys' secondary school located on the NSW Central Coast. It has approximately 1,000 students and 100 staff.

History
The school was opened in 1953 by the Congregation of Christian Brothers.

The Regal Theatre, in the city, was demolished in 1978 and the remains of the building were used as land fill for the College ovals.

In 2003, St Edward's College celebrated its 50th anniversary and on the day of its creation Founders Day used to be celebrated at the school with markets and games. 

In 2013, St Edward's College celebrated its 60th anniversary.

In 2023, St Edward's College will celebrate its 70th anniversary.

Facilities
St Edward’s covers a nine hectare site on the shores of Caroline Bay.  The College has three multi-purpose ovals, other sporting facilities, a multipurpose hall/gymnasium known as the Edmund Rice Centre (or ERC), specialised technology and art facilities, computer laboratories, a library housing more than 7000 books, three music rooms in addition to 6 practical rooms and a purpose built food technology room.

Academic arrangements
The College operate a year 7 Core programme where the students are placed in 'Core classes'. Here the students have one teacher in the same room, for their core subjects of English, Religion and HSIE. They then go to their other subjects. This approach helps ease the transition from primary to high school.

Co-curricular program

Outdoor education
St Edward's College runs an Outdoor Education programme through camps, which are held in Years 7 to 10.  The programme provides a sequential course for the four years, developing skills of a higher order each year. Some of the activities conducted on these camps include archery, canoeing, "deep and meaningful" conversation sessions, sailing, windsurfing, abseiling, rock climbing, mountain biking, initiative challenges and fencing.

Social justice
The college has a significant emphasis on the concept of social justice and 'giving back' to the community; and is described as a 'Central part of school life at St. Edwards'. In 2002, teacher, Patrick Dell introduced a programme called The Waterford Project, where boys from years 8-11 perform compulsory community service and offers a wide variety of activities to help students complete their hours. The Waterford Project is named for the city in Ireland where Edmund Ignatius Rice, the founder of the Christian Brothers', began his work.

Athletics
2005 - The school won its third state basketball title in four years.
2008 - U/14 NSW Country Rugby Union Champions. Vincent Fester Shield Winners
2008 - Final 16 of the Arrive Alive Cup Rugby league competition
2012 - U/16 NSW All Schools Rugby League Champions
2014 - U/16 NSW rugby union sevens champions. Edu Connex Central Coast sevens $1000 tournament winners.

Notable alumni
Upon leaving school, students are known as Old Boys and are able to join into the Old Boys Union, an organisation of ex-students that seeks to maintain the friendships created while at the College.

 Bradman Bestrugby league player
 Paul BevanAustralian rules football player
 Oliver Bozanicfootballer 
 Larry Davidsonprofessional basketball player

 Matt Hodgsonrugby union player
 James Maloneyrugby league player 
 Tom Slingsbysailor, Olympic gold medallist at the 2012 Summer Olympics
 Connor Watsonrugby league player
 Tom Starlingrugby league player
 Jacob Saifitirugby league player
 Daniel Saifitirugby league player
 Matthew Simon - soccer player

See also

 List of non-government schools in New South Wales
 Catholic education in Australia

References

External links
 Official site

Catholic secondary schools in New South Wales
Boys' schools in New South Wales
Congregation of Christian Brothers secondary schools in Australia
Educational institutions established in 1953
1953 establishments in Australia
Central Coast (New South Wales)